The Big Apple Anime Fest (BAAF) was an anime convention which was held annually between 2001 and 2003 and supported by a consortium of anime and manga companies.

History

Event history

Cancellations
Despite confirmed dates for 2004, Big Apple Anime Fest announced on its web site that it would skip its event in 2004 due to the Republican National Convention, which was to be held in New York City over Labor Day weekend. The following year, John O'Donnell of Central Park Media, one of the companies supporting Big Apple Anime Fest, informed AnimeCons.com that he was, "unaware of any plans for BAAF 2005 at this time." The convention has not been held since and it is uncertain if there are any plans to revive it.

Attendance counting
Big Apple Anime Fest's metric for counting attendance differed from those typically used by other anime conventions, counting person-days ("turnstile attendance") rather than memberships sold.

See also
 Anime NYC
 New York Comic Con
 List of anime conventions

References

External links 
  An account of the first BAAF by a former employee of Central Park Media, the originating company.

Festivals in New York City
Defunct anime conventions
Recurring events established in 2001
Recurring events disestablished in 2003